Addagadde  is a village on the banks of river Tunga in the southern state of Karnataka, India. It is located in  Sringeri taluk of Chikkamagaluru district at a distance of 8 km away from Sringeri, on Sringeri to Shivamogga highway. It is a panchayat village, filled with plenty of greenery and a classic example of a Malnad village set up. The village has a population of around 1500, where majority depends on arecanut cultivation. Addagadde has a historical Veerabhadreshwara temple.

See also 
 Chikmagalur
 Districts of Karnataka

References

External links 
 http://Chikmagalur.nic.in/

Villages in Chikkamagaluru district